The Men's European Volleyball Championship (EuroVolley) is the official competition for senior men's national volleyball teams of Europe, organized by the European Volleyball Confederation (CEV). The initial gap between championships was variable, but since 1975 they have been awarded every two years. The current champion is Italy, which won its seventh title at the 2021 tournament.

History
The first tournament was held in 1948 with participation of six national teams. Being only participant from Eastern Europe, Czechoslovakia captured gold. The teams from Eastern Europe dominated at the tournament for next four decades. The next two editions held in 1950 and 1951 were won by the Soviet Union (who also won two World Championships in 1949 and 1952). However, in late 1950s Czechoslovakia managed to return at first positions. They captured European gold in 1955 and repeated this success at next edition in 1958 (also winning World Championship in 1956). In 1963, twice runner-up Romania won its maiden European title at the home tournament.

The victory in 1967 marked the beginning of the 20-year era of dominance of the Soviet Union. From 1967 to 1987, Soviet team didn't lose any tournament by winning 9 European titles in a row. The names of leading Soviet players of these times such as Vyacheslav Zaytsev, Aleksandr Savin, Vladimir Kondra, Viljar Loor, Yury Panchenko and Vladimir Chernyshyov are known to volleyball enthusiasts all over the world. From 1977 to 1985, Soviet team was coached by Vyacheslav Platonov who led national team to five European titles in a row as well as to two World Championship titles (1978, 1982), two World Cup titles (1977, 1981) and Olympic gold in 1980. The main European rival of Soviet team at these times, Poland (1974 World Champion and 1976 Olympic Champion) was runner-up for the five times in a row (from 1975 to 1983).

Soviet domination was ceased in 1989 when Italy under leadership of Argentinian coach Julio Velasco unprecedentally won their first ever official tournament. Soviet team surprisingly failed to even reach podium after losing to Sweden (hosts) in semifinals and to Netherlands in a bronze-medal match. However, in 1991, in their last participation at the competition, Soviet Union won European title for the 12th time after 3–0 victories over a Netherlands in semifinals and Italy in the final match. Vyacheslav Platonov won European title as head coach for the record sixth time.

Following the Soviet Union's dissolution in December 1991, Italy led by such players as Andrea Gardini, Andrea Giani, Paolo Tofoli and Lorenzo Bernardi became indisputably the best team not only in Europe but also in the world. They won three World Championships in a row (1990, 1994, 1998) and also dominated at European Championships by winning five of the next seven tournaments (from 1993 to 2005). However, ironically they never managed to win Olympic gold. Netherlands who became Olympic Champion in 1996 also managed to win their maiden European title at the home tournament next year. FR Yugoslavia who won Olympic gold in 2000 also became European Champion for the first time at the next-year tournament.

After victory in 2005, the period of Italy's dominance came to end, and more national teams were managed to win their maiden European title. The next tournament was surprisingly won by Spain who managed to beat home favorites – Russia – in a closest 5th-set tie-breaker. In 2009, Poland became European Champion for the first time. The next tournament was won by Serbia for the first time since dissolution of the Serbia and Montenegro (the country which was previously known as FR Yugoslavia). In 2013, Russia (who became Olympic Champion in 2012) finally managed to win their first European title since the Soviet Union's dissolution. The next edition was successful for France who also won their maiden European gold.

The 2017 European Championship took place in Poland. It was won by Russia who defeated Germany in a 5th-set tie-breaker. The 2019 European Championship  was co-hosted by four countries for first time – France, Slovenia, Belgium and the Netherlands. Serbia won this tournament after 3–1 victory over Slovenia in the final match in Paris. The co-host countries of 2021 edition were Poland, Czech Republic, Estonia and Finland. In the final match held in Katowice, Italy defeated Slovenia in a 5th-set tie-breaker and won their seventh European title – the first in 16 years.

The 32 European Championship tournaments have been won by nine different nations. Russia have won fourteen times (twelve as Soviet Union). The other European Championship winners are Italy, with seven titles; Czech Republic (as Czechoslovakia) and Serbia (one as FR Yugoslavia) with three titles; and France, Netherlands, Poland, Romania and Spain, with one title each.

The current format of the competition involves a qualification phase, which currently takes place over the preceding two years, to determine which teams qualify for the tournament phase, which is often called the European Championship Finals. 24 teams, including the automatically qualifying host nation(s), compete in the tournament phase for the title at venues within the host nation(s) over a period of about two weeks.

Italy co-holds record for the participation at the European Championships (31 times) by missing only one tournament. Russia also participated at the 31 European Championships (sixteen as Soviet Union). Bulgaria and France participated at the 30 continental tournaments each.

Results summary

Medals summary

Total hosts

* = co-hosts

Participating nations
Legend
 – Champions
 – Runners-up
 – Third place
 – Fourth place
 – Did not enter / Did not qualify
 – Hosts
Q – Qualified for forthcoming tournament

MVP by edition

1948–1977 – Not awarded
1979 – 
1983 – 
1985 – 
1987 – 
1989 – 
1991 – 
1993 – 
1995 – 
1997 – 
1999 – 

2001 – 
2003 – 
2005 – 
2007 – 
2009 – 
2011 – 
2013 – 
2015 – 
2017 – 
2019 – 
2021 –

Most successful players

Boldface denotes active volleyball players and highest medal count among all players (including these who not included in these tables) per type.

Multiple gold medalists

Multiple medalists
The table shows players who have won at least 6 medals in total at the European Championships.

See also

 Women's European Volleyball Championship
 European Men's Volleyball League
 Men's Junior European Volleyball Championship
 Boys' Youth European Volleyball Championship

References

External links
CEV

 
 
Recurring sporting events established in 1948
International volleyball competitions
International men's volleyball competitions
European championships
European volleyball records and statistics
Volleyball competitions in Europe
Biennial sporting events
1948 establishments in Europe